Ochrilidia is a genus of grasshoppers in the subfamily Gomphocerinae and typical of the tribe Ochrilidiini; it was erected by Carl Stål in 1873.  Species have been recorded from Africa, the Middle East through to India and certain Mediterranean islands in Europe.

Species 
The Orthoptera Species File lists:
 Ochrilidia ahmadi Wagan & Baloch, 2001
 Ochrilidia albrechti Jago, 1977
 Ochrilidia alshatiensis Usmani & Ajaili, 1991
 Ochrilidia beybienkoi Cejchan, 1969
 Ochrilidia cretacea (Bolívar, 1914)
 Ochrilidia curta Bey-Bienko, 1960
 Ochrilidia filicornis (Krauss, 1902)
 Ochrilidia geniculata (Bolívar, 1913)
 Ochrilidia gracilis (Krauss, 1902)
 Ochrilidia harterti (Bolívar, 1913)
 Ochrilidia hebetata (Uvarov, 1926)
 Ochrilidia intermedia (Bolívar, 1908)
 Ochrilidia jagoi Wagan, Baloch & Khatri, 2017
 Ochrilidia johnstoni (Salfi, 1931)
 †Ochrilidia lineata Piton, 1940
 Ochrilidia marmorata Uvarov, 1952
 Ochrilidia martini (Bolívar, 1908)
 Ochrilidia mistshenkoi (Bey-Bienko, 1936)
 Ochrilidia nubica (Werner, 1913)
 Ochrilidia nuragica Massa, 1994
 Ochrilidia obsoleta (Uvarov, 1936)
 Ochrilidia orientalis Salfi, 1931
 Ochrilidia pachypes Chopard, 1950
 Ochrilidia pasquieri Descamps, 1968
 Ochrilidia persica (Salfi, 1931)
 Ochrilidia popovi Jago, 1977
 Ochrilidia pruinosa Brunner von Wattenwyl, 1882
 Ochrilidia richteri Bey-Bienko, 1960
 Ochrilidia sicula (Salfi, 1931)
 Ochrilidia socotrae Massa, 2009
 Ochrilidia surcoufi (Chopard, 1937)
 Ochrilidia tibialis (Fieber, 1853)
 Ochrilidia tryxalicera Stål, 1873 - type species
 Ochrilidia turanica (Bey-Bienko, 1936)

References

External links

Orthoptera genera
Orthoptera of Asia
Orthoptera of Africa
Orthoptera of Europe
Gomphocerinae